Hume-Rothery rules, named after William Hume-Rothery, are a set of basic rules that describe the conditions under which an element could dissolve in a metal, forming a solid solution.  There are two sets of rules; one refers to substitutional solid solutions, and the other refers to interstitial solid solutions.

Substitutional solid solution rules
For substitutional solid solutions, the Hume-Rothery rules are as follows:

 The atomic radius of the solute and solvent atoms must differ by no more than 15%:

 The crystal structures of solute and solvent must be similar.
 Complete solubility occurs when the solvent and solute have the same valency.  A metal is more likely to dissolve a metal of higher valency, than vice versa.   
 The solute and solvent should have  similar electronegativity. If the electronegativity difference is too great, the metals tend to form intermetallic compounds instead of solid solutions.

Interstitial solid solution rules
For interstitial solid solutions, the Hume-Rothery Rules are:

 Solute atoms should have a smaller radius than 59% of the radius of solvent atoms.  
 The solute and solvent should have similar electronegativity.
 Valency factor: two elements should have the same valence. The greater the difference in valence between solute and solvent atoms, the lower the solubility.

Solid solution rules for multicomponent systems
Fundamentally, the Hume-Rothery rules are restricted to binary systems that form either substitutional or interstitial solid solutions. However, this approach limits assessing advanced alloys which are commonly multicomponent systems. Free energy diagrams (or phase diagrams) offer in-depth knowledge of equilibrium restraints in complex systems. In essence the Hume-Rothery rules (and Pauling's rules) are based on geometrical restraints. Likewise are the advancements being done to the Hume-Rothery rules. Where they are being considered as critical contact criterion describable with Voronoi diagrams. This could ease the theoretical phase diagram generation of multicomponent systems.

See also
 CALPHAD
 Enthalpy of mixing
 Gibbs energy
 Phase diagram

References

Further reading

Materials science
Rules